San Wai is the name of several places in Hong Kong:

 San Wai (North District) a.k.a. Kun Lung Wai, a walled village in Lung Yeuk Tau, Fanling, North District
 San Wai (Ha Tsuen), in Ha Tsuen, Yuen Long District
 San Wai (San Tin) or San Wai Tsuen, in San Tin, Yuen Long District
And also
 Kei Ling Ha San Wai, in Kei Ling Ha, Sai Kung North
 Pui O San Wai, in Pui O, Lantau Island

See also
 San Wai Tsai (disambiguation), the name of two villages in Hong Kong
 San Wai Court, a public housing estate in Tuen Mun
 San Wai stop, a Light Rail stop in Tuen Mun